Liew Foh Sin (born 1898, date of death unknown) was a Malaysian sports shooter. He competed in the trap event at the 1956 Summer Olympics.

References

External links
 

1898 births
Year of death missing
Malaysian male sport shooters
Olympic shooters of Malaya
Shooters at the 1956 Summer Olympics
Place of birth missing